GI or Gi may refer to:

Military
 G.I., a nickname for U.S. Army soldiers

Arts and entertainment
 GI (album), an album by the Germs
 Gi (Captain Planet character)
 Game Informer, a magazine
 Global Icon (band), a South Korean group

Organisations
 Goethe-Institut, a German cultural association
 General Instrument, an electronics company
 Gesellschaft für Informatik, a German computer society
 Guaranteed Irish, a business membership network

Science and technology
 GI, a complexity class in the graph isomorphism problem
 Galvanized iron

Biology and medicine
 Gi alpha subunit, a protein
 Gastrointestinal tract (GI tract)
 Gigantocellular reticular nucleus, a subregion of the medullary reticular formation
 Glycemic index, measuring a food's effect on blood glucose

Computing
 .gi, the country code top-level domain for Gibraltar
 Gi (prefix symbol) (gibi), a binary prefix
 Global illumination, a group of 3D graphics algorithms

Transport
 Guduvancheri railway station (Indian Railways station code), a railway station in Tamil Nadu, India
 Itek Air (IATA airline designator), a former airline based in Kyrgyzstan

Other uses
Gibraltar (ISO 3166-1 country code)
G.I. Generation, a demographic cohort
Graphics Interface, a conference on computer graphics and human–computer interaction
Geographical indication, on products which corresponds to a geographical location or origin
Gi (kana), a syllabic character in Japanese script
Gi (cuneiform), a sign in cuneiform writing
Greg Inglis (born 1987), Australian rugby league footballer
Keikogi, a Japanese martial arts uniform known in English simply as a gi

See also
 G.I. Joe (disambiguation)
 Keikogi, a martial arts uniform
 Judogi
 Karate gi
 Brazilian jiu-jitsu gi